Lennoa is a monotypic genus of flowering plants belonging to the family Boraginaceae. It only contains one known species, Lennoa madreporoides Lex.  It is within the subfamily of Lennoaceae.

Its native range is Mexico to Venezuela. It is found in the countries of Colombia, Costa Rica, Guatemala, Mexico, Nicaragua and Venezuela.

It has the common name of Flor de tierra (or “flower of the earth”).
It is a root parasite, usually found growing on roots of the Mexican sunflower (Tithonia). They bloom in the fall (autumn).

The genus name of Lennoa is in honour of Joaquín Leño, a Mexican independence fighter. It has one known synonym Corallophyllum .
The species has the Latin specific epithet of madreporoides which refers to the genus Madrepora (which in Latin means "mother of pores") and the Greco-Roman suffix -oides ("similar to"), due to its resemblance to this genus of corals.

Both the genus and the species were first described and published in P.de La Llave & J.M.de Lexarza, Nov. Veg. Descr. Vol.1 on page 7 in 1824.

References

Other sources
 Breedlove, DE 1986. Flora of Chiapas. Florist Listings. Mexico 4: i - v, 1–246.
 CONABIO. 2009. Taxonomic catalog of Mexican species. 1. In Capital Nat. Mexico. CONABIO, Mexico City.
 Davidse, G., M. Sousa Sánchez, S. Knapp & F. Chiang Cabrera. 2012. Verbenaceae. 4 (2): 453–473. In G. Davidse, M. Sousa Sánchez, S. Knapp & F. Chiang * * Cabrera (eds.) Fl. Mesoamer .. Missouri Botanical Garden Press, St. Louis.
 Gibson, DN 1970. Lennoaceae. In Standley, PC & LO Williams (eds.), Flora of Guatemala - Part IX, Numbers 1 and 2. Fieldiana, Bot. 24 (9 / 1–2): 96–99.
 Grayum, MH 2007. Lennoaceae. In: Manual of Plants of Costa Rica. Vol. 6. BE Hammel, MH Grayum, C. Herrera & N. Zamora (eds.). Monogr. Syst. Bot. Missouri Bot. Gard. 111: 187-188.
 Hokche, O., PE Berry & O. Huber. (eds.) 2008. New Cat. Fl. Vasc. Venezuela 1–860. Botanical Institute of Venezuela Foundation, Caracas.
 Stevens, WD, C. Ulloa Ulloa, A. Pool & OM Montiel Jarquín. 2001. Flora of Nicaragua. Monogr. Syst. Bot. Missouri Bot. Gard. 85: i-xlii,.

Lennooideae
Boraginaceae genera
Plants described in 1824
Flora of Mexico
Flora of Central America
Flora of Venezuela
Flora of Colombia